"Mother Nature's Son" is the eleventh Christmas special episode of the BBC sitcom Only Fools and Horses. It was first broadcast on 25 December 1992. In the episode, Del sells tap water as Peckham Spring.

Synopsis
With Christmas coming, Del's application to buy the Trotter family's council flat in "Yuppy Love" has finally been granted, albeit rather late and suddenly, meaning that he now owns the flat, but is not as able to pay the mortgage as he was originally planning to. He also inherits Grandad's old allotment and receives a summons from the council, ordering him to remove a public health hazard from his land. The health hazard turns out to be barrels containing an unknown yellow substance. Del enlists Trigger and Denzil to help him get rid of the yellow liquid, saying he will help them (though he wears a diving suit), by transporting it in Denzil's van to the "24-hour" council waste disposal depot (which is closed at night), although they ultimately dump it "in a pond".

Del accompanies Rodney to an organic health food shop owned by a wealthy gardening enthusiast named Myles. When he sees the high price of the store's produce, Del develops an interest in gardening and invites Myles to the allotment to advise him on growing vegetables. At the allotment, Myles notices a mysterious water source - which Del calls the Peckham Spring - and suggests that if the water is pure, it could be bottled and sold. However, unsighted by Myles, Rodney notices that the "spring water" is actually coming from a nearby tap connected to a hose and concealed by rocks. Del instructs Albert to take a sample of the water for laboratory testing but, being part of the scam, Albert uses bottled mineral water instead. The water receives a certificate of purity from Myles' committee, giving Del permission to sell it.

A production line is set up in the Trotters' flat, with Del filling up bottles from his kitchen tap. Peckham Spring Water quickly becomes one of Myles' biggest-selling products, and is given a trial at a major national supermarket. Sales are further boosted by the drought warnings issued by the local water board, who believe there is a serious underground leak due to the high volume of water being used by Del. The Trotters earn enough money for a Christmas holiday at the Grand Hotel, Brighton. In the final scene, as the Trotter family go to sleep in their hotel rooms, the BBC News reports that Peckham is without water after a local reservoir has been contaminated by the barrels dumped by Del, Denzil, and Trigger. As a blissfully unaware Del switches off the light, a bottle of Peckham Spring on his bedside table glows yellow, indicating that he has been giving the barrels' contents to his customers.

Episode cast

Episode concept
The idea for the script was based on a real-life incident where people had their water supply closed as something had been dumped in a nearby reservoir.

Music
 Slade: "Merry Xmas Everybody"
 Carl Orff: "O Fortuna" from Carmina Burana
 Elton John: "Crocodile Rock"
 Take That: "Could It Be Magic"
 Bjorn Again: "Santa Claus Is Coming To Town"
 The Beatles: "Money (That's What I Want)"

Note: In the VHS/DVD versions, The Beatles' "Money" is replaced by an instrumental tune, and Carl Orff's "O Fortuna" is replaced by a similar-sounding piece of music.

Legacy
In 2004, the Coca-Cola Company launched their bottled water brand Dasani in the United Kingdom. Due to the proximity of the bottling plant in Sidcup to real life Peckham, along with a contamination scandal leading to the product's withdrawal, comparisons were often made to the events in Mother Nature's Son in the press.

References

External links

1992 British television episodes
British Christmas television episodes
Only Fools and Horses special episodes